A handshake is a one-on-one, interpersonal greeting ritual.

Handshake may also refer to:

 Handshake (computing), a computing term related to automated communication between two computing devices or programs
 Handshake deal, a verbal commitment to a transaction
Handshaking lemma, a specific statement in graph theory

See also 
 Hand Shakers, a Japanese anime television series
 Secret Handshake (disambiguation)